is a Japanese luger. He competed in the men's doubles event at the 1976 Winter Olympics.

References

1948 births
Living people
Japanese male lugers
Olympic lugers of Japan
Lugers at the 1976 Winter Olympics
Sportspeople from Hokkaido